Lake Vegoritida (Limni Vegoritida), also known in the past as Lake Ostrovo (Limni Ostrovou), is a large natural lake in western Macedonia, northern Greece. It is situated 6 km northeast of Amyntaio and 18 km west of Edessa, at 540 m elevation. The Voras Mountains lie to the north. It belongs partly to the Florina regional unit and partly to the Pella regional unit.

See also
List of lakes in Greece
Ostrovo Unit of the Scottish Women's Hospitals during the First World War

Sources 

 K. Fytianos, V. Samanidou, T. Agelidis. Comparative Study of Heavy Metals Pollution in Various Rivers and Lakes of Northern Greece. Chemosphere, Vol.16, Nos.2/3, pp 455–462, 1987

Vegoritida
Landforms of Florina (regional unit)
Landforms of Pella (regional unit)
Landforms of Central Macedonia
Landforms of Western Macedonia